Andrei Gennadievich Cherkasov (born 4 July 1970) is a former professional tennis player from Russia.

Career
Born in Ufa, Soviet Union, Cherkasov first came to the tennis world's attention as an outstanding junior player. In 1987, he was ranked the World No. 3 junior player and finished runner-up in the boys' singles at the US Open (lost to David Wheaton in the final).

Cherkasov turned professional in 1988. In 1990, Cherkasov claimed his first top-level singles titles when he won the inaugural Kremlin Cup in Moscow, defeating Tim Mayotte in the final 6–2, 6–1. He also reached the quarter-finals of the 1990 Australian Open and US Open.

In June 1991 Cherkasov reached his career-high singles ranking of World No. 13. In November he successfully defended his Kremlin Cup title, saving two match points in a 7–6, 3–6, 7–6 win in the final against Jakob Hlasek.

In 1992, Cherkasov was a quarter-finalist at the French Open and won a men's singles bronze medal at the Olympic Games in Barcelona, notably rallying from 2 sets down to beat Pete Sampras in the third round.

In 1993, Cherkasov saved three match points in 3-hour, 54-minute quarter-final victory over Italy's Andrea Gaudenzi at Tel Aviv, to win 6–7, 7–6, 7–5 in what was the longest best-of-three set match in tour history.

In the end, his two victories at the Kremlin Cup in Moscow proved to be the only top-level titles of Cherkasov's career. He retired from the professional tour in 2000, having earned prize-money totalling $2,259,875.

ATP career finals

Singles: 6 (2 titles, 4 runner-ups)

Doubles: 2 (2 runners-up)

ATP Challenger and ITF Futures finals

Singles: 9 (5–4)

Doubles: 7 (3–4)

Junior Grand Slam finals

Singles: 1 (1 runner-up)

Performance timeline

Singles

Notes

External links
 
 
 

1970 births
Hopman Cup competitors
Living people
Olympic bronze medalists for the Unified Team
Olympic medalists in tennis
Olympic tennis players of the Soviet Union
Olympic tennis players of the Unified Team
Sportspeople from Ufa
Russian expatriates in Monaco
Russian male tennis players
Soviet male tennis players
Tennis players at the 1988 Summer Olympics
Tennis players at the 1992 Summer Olympics
Medalists at the 1992 Summer Olympics